WJPR (91.7 FM) is an American non-commercial educational radio station licensed to serve the community of Jasper, Indiana. The station, established in 2005, is owned and operated by Jasper Public Radio, Inc. The station is organized through a local board of directors who oversee the station's operation.

Programming
WJPR broadcasts a public radio/classic hits format featuring hit music of the 1960s, 1970s, and 1980s. WJPR also provides local and national educational programming including Indiana University produced Moment of Science, Moment of Indiana History and Congressional Moments along with various locally produced educational and informative programs.  On-Air voice personalities and imaging for the station include Alan Williams and Greg Johnson.

In January 2014, WJPR entered into a partnership with a newly formed multi-media news platform company to supply local audio news content on the air at the top of the hour Monday thru Friday from 6 am to 6 pm. News content is provided by Mick Birge. News Now Dubois County, produced by Star Valley Productions, supplies WJPR with local state and national news, and sports pertinent to Jasper and Dubois County. The audio presentation is set to complement the online presence of News Now Dubois County and their multi-media website located at newsnowdc.com.

History
The station, licensed as "WKJR", was assigned the call sign "WJPR" by the Federal Communications Commission (FCC) on August 2, 2006.

See also
WJPR may also refer informally to a "Part 15" AM radio station in Highland Park, New Jersey, which broadcasts a Jewish format to the central New Jersey community.

References

External links

Classic hits radio stations in the United States
Dubois County, Indiana
Public radio stations in the United States
Radio stations established in 2005
JPR